ART, also known as Big Red Art, is a 1999 steel sculpture by Doris Shlayn, installed outside the Columbus College of Art and Design in Columbus, Ohio, United States. It was installed on June 23, 2001.

The "A" spans 101 ft and straddles East Gay Street, and cars and pedestrians can pass underneath.

See also
 1999 in art

References

1999 sculptures
2001 establishments in Ohio
Downtown Columbus, Ohio
Outdoor sculptures in Columbus, Ohio
Steel sculptures in Ohio